Nicholaas Jalink (born 22 June 1964) is a Dutch former footballer and football manager.

In a career spanning some eighteen years, the midfielder played 480 professional league games, scoring seventy goals. He spent almost a year in England with Port Vale, though the majority of his career was spent in the Eredivisie. He played most of his football with hometown clubs Excelsior Rotterdam and Sparta Rotterdam, but also spent time with AZ Alkmaar, Fortuna Sittard, RKC Waalwijk, NAC Breda, and FC Dordrecht. He later managed amateur side DOTO.

Playing career
Jalink started his career with Excelsior Rotterdam. He made his debut as a substitute on 24 August 1983, against Roda JC Kerkrade at the Gemeentelijk Sportpark Kaalheide, replacing Carlo van Tour. He scored four goals in 27 matches in the 1983–84 season. He went on to score nine goals in 31 games in 1984–85 and eight goals in 33 appearances in 1985–86. He then was signed by Eredivisie rivals AZ Alkmaar, and played 27 games in 1986–87, before scoring six goals in 17 appearances in 1987–88. AZ were relegated in 1988, but Jalink remained in the top-flight as he switched sides to sign with Fortuna Sittard, along with teammate Pier Tol, and scored twice in 15 games in the latter half of the 1987–88 campaign. He scored six goals in 29 appearances in 1988–89, before moving on to RKC Waalwijk. He claimed two goals in 23 appearances in 1989–90, and then scored five times in 29 games in 1990–91.

He left Holland for England to play for Port Vale in June 1991. He played fairly regular football until losing his place in January 1992. He featured 32 times for John Rudge's "Valiants" in 1991–92, scoring once in a 1–0 win over Derby County at Vale Park on 6 November. The club were relegated out of the Second Division. His contract was terminated in March 1992 and he returned to his native lands to re-sign with RKC Waalwijk.

Jalink scored four goals in 26 games in 1992–93, before transferring to Sparta Rotterdam. He scored five goals in 28 games in 1994–95 and then four goals in 32 games in 1995–96. He spent the 1996–97 campaign with NAC Breda, featuring in 25 league games. He then returned to Sparta, and posted 17 appearances in 1997–98, scoring three goals. He scored twice in 23 games in 1998–99; Sparta finished in the relegation play-off zone, but won their group to remain in the top-flight. Jalink then dropped into the Eerste Divisie to play for FC Dordrecht. He scored four goals in 22 matches in 1999–2000 and then two goals in 24 appearances in 2000–01, before announcing his retirement.

Coaching career
After retiring as a player he became a trainer at FC Dordrecht, before becoming a trainer at Sparta Rotterdam in 2003 and 2004. He later managed amateur side Door Ontwikkeling Tot Ontspanning.

Career statistics
Sources:

References

1964 births
Living people
Footballers from Rotterdam
Dutch footballers
Association football midfielders
Excelsior Rotterdam players
AZ Alkmaar players
Fortuna Sittard players
RKC Waalwijk players
Dutch expatriate footballers
Expatriate footballers in England
Port Vale F.C. players
Sparta Rotterdam players
NAC Breda players
FC Dordrecht players
Eredivisie players
English Football League players
Eerste Divisie players
Dutch football managers
Association football coaches